= Samarium disilicide =

Names
- Other names Samarium silicide, samarium(II) silicide

Identifiers
CAS Number	12300-22-0
3D model (JSmol)	Interactive image
ChemSpider	50645108
ECHA InfoCard	100.032.324
EC Number	235-570-1
CompTox Dashboard (EPA)	DTXSID101312447
- InChI: InChI=1S/2Si.Sm Key: XDMXYDKSBNQCCH-UHFFFAOYSA-N
- SMILES: [Si].[Si].[Sm]

Properties
Chemical formula	Si_{2}Sm
Molar mass	206.53 g·mol^{−1}
Appearance	Crystals
Density	7.54 g/cm^{3}
Solubility in water	insoluble

Structure
Crystal structure	Orthorhombic
Space group	α-SmSi_{2} orthorhombic β-SmSi_{2} tetragonal
- Except where otherwise noted, data are given for materials in their standard state (at 25 °C [77 °F], 100 kPa). Infobox references

Samarium disilicide is a binary inorganic compound of samarium and silicon with the chemical formula SmSi_{2}.

== Synthesis ==
SmSi_{2} is prepared by reducing samarium oxide with silicon in vacuum at 1550-1600 °C.

== Physical properties ==
Samarium disilicide exists in two crystalline modifications: α-SmSi_{2} and β-SmSi_{2}, with lattices of the YSi_{2} orthorhombic (space group I mma) and ThSi_{2} tetragonal (space group I41/amd.) types respectively and a transformation temperature of 380 °C.

The compound melts congruently at a temperature of ≈1800 °C.
